The Kazakhstani women's football championship  is contested in the top level women's football league in Kazakhstan. Before 1991, some Kazakh women's clubs had competed in the Soviet Union women's league system, but after the collapse of the Soviet Union most women's teams left for Russia or simply dissolved. 

The number of teams varies from year to year. In 2008 there were 4 teams, 7 in 2009 and 5 in 2015.

The league is played on several matchdays a summer. With now 5 teams, there will be 4 matchdays, actually about a week long, which features a full round robin (so 10 matches, two per day). The winner after the last matchday is the champion and qualifies for a spot in the UEFA Women's Champions League.

2020 teams 
 BIIK-Kazygurt (Shymkent)
 FK Jas Sunkar
 Kaisar
 Okzhetpes (Kokshetau)
 SDYuSShOR No.8 Astana (Nur-Sultan)
 Turan (Turkistan)

Champions 

 2004: Alma-KTZH
 2005: Alma-KTZh
 2006: Alma-KTZh
 2007: Alma-KTZh
 2008: Alma-KTZh
 2009: CSHVSM
 2010: CSHVSM
 2011: BIIK Kazygurt
 2012: CSHVSM
 2013: BIIK Kazygurt
 2014: BIIK Kazygurt
 2015: BIIK Kazygurt
 2016: BIIK Kazygurt
 2017: BIIK Kazygurt
 2018: BIIK Kazygurt
 2019: BIIK Kazygurt
 2020: BIIK Kazygurt

CSHVSM played the 2009 season under the name SDYUSSHOR № 2. It's the same team however.

References

External links 
 League at UEFA
 Official Site (Kazakh)
 English version

Women
Top level women's association football leagues in Europe
1
Women's sports leagues in Kazakhstan